Glenda Braganza  is a Canadian television and stage actress who has appeared in several Canadian and American television shows and films.

Braganza was born in Halifax, Nova Scotia to Indian-Goan parents, and was raised in Ottawa, Ontario. She lived for many years in Montreal, Quebec, Canada, before moving to Toronto. After graduating from Concordia University in 2001, she worked and received critical praise in several productions on the Montreal stage, including in Jennydog, Jane Eyre, and at the Montreal Fringe. Her various performances earned her the Montreal English Critics Circle Award as the Best Actress of 2003-04. She most recently starred as Gina Green in the Hollywood made-for-television film 10.5: Apocalypse, which was about a natural disaster to hit the United States; it starred Dean Cain and Beau Bridges.

She has also been on Canadian television with a featured role in the Stephen Surjik film Tripping the Wire, and on American television with a recurring role on the Independent Film Channel original series The Business.

Filmography
 My First Wedding (2004): Young Woman
 Tripping the Wire: A Stephen Tree Mystery (2005): Angie Baron
 10.5: Apocalypse (2006): Gina Green
 Last Exit (2006): Sonogram Technician
 Infected (2008)
 Afterwards (2008): Rachel
 Men with Brooms (2010): Rani
 Saving Hope (2012–2015): Dr. Melanda Tolliver
 Holidaze (2013): Stacy
A Simple Favor (2018): Mrs. Kerry Glenda

References

External links
 

1978 births
Actresses from Halifax, Nova Scotia
Actresses from Montreal
Actresses from Ottawa
Anglophone Quebec people
Canadian actresses of Indian descent
Canadian people of Goan descent
Canadian stage actresses
Canadian television actresses
Concordia University alumni
Living people